Colour of Love or variants may refer to:

Books
The Color of Love (manga) (コイノイロ, Koi no Iro?) Japanese manga written and illustrated by Kiyo Ueda
Colours of Love: An Exploration of the Ways of Loving (1973), Color wheel theory of love John Alan Lee
The Colors of Love: What Kind of Lover Are You..? Color wheel theory of love John Alan Lee 1977
The Colours of Love, romance novel  by Rita Bradshaw 2015
The Color of Love, romance novel by Sandra Kitt 2000
The Color of Love, romance novel by Radclyffe

Film and TV
The Color of Love (1991 film) American film with Beatrice de Borg Marlene Forte and Isaiah Washington
Homage to Chagall: The Colours of Love 1977 Canadian documentary film about artist Marc Chagall
Colours of Love (TV series) (森之愛情) (2007) HotCha

Music
The Colors of Love (band), 1960s band which included singer Elaine Paige "I'm a Train" 
Colors of Love, children's choir "Conviction of the Heart" Leap of Faith (Kenny Loggins album)

Albums
Colours of Love, album by Hugo Montenegro 1970
Colors of Love (Kelly Chen album) Cantonese greatest hits album by Hong Kong singer Kelly Chen  1999
Colors of Love (Chanticleer album) 1999
Colour of Love (Sam Moran album) 2010
Colours of Love, Hindi album from Sonu Nigam discography 2007
Colors of Love, Japanese EP by Mao Denda 2007
Colors of Love, album by Peaches & Herb 2009 
The Colour of Love, album by Ronnie Earl 1997
The Colour of My Love, album by Céline Dion 1993

Songs
"Colour of Love" (Snap song)
"Colour of Love" (Trancylvania song), single by Norwegian Eurodance group Trancylvania 1995
"The Colour of Love", Billy Ocean song from Tear Down These Walls
"The Colour of Love" (The Reese Project song), song by The Reese Project 1992  
"The Color of Love", song by Boyz II Men
"Colours of Love" (Vicky Leandros song), version of "L'amour est bleu"
"Colours of Love", song by One Horse Blue from One Horse Blue (1993 album)
"Colours of Love", song by Albion Band from the album Albion Heart
"Colors of Love", written by Carole Bayer Sager, James Ingram and Bruce Roberts, Made in America (1993 film) by Lisa Fischer
"Colors of Love", song by Beverly Bremers from I'll Make You Music (album)  1972